The KLIA East Road, or Jalan Kuarters KLIA, Federal Route 344, is a fourth highway in Kuala Lumpur International Airport (KLIA) in Malaysia that connects the KLIA Outer Ring Road (Federal Route 27) junctions near Sepang International Circuit in Selangor to KLIA Quarters in Negeri Sembilan. It is also a main route to Sepang and Labu town.

The Kilometre Zero is located at Sepang International Circuit junctions of the KLIA Outer Ring Road (Federal Route 27)

At most sections, the Federal Route 344 was built under the JKR R5 road standard, allowing maximum speed limit of up to 90 km/h.

List of junctions

See also
KLIA Outer Ring Road
Jalan KLIA 1
KLIA Expressway
Kuala Lumpur International Airport (KLIA)

References

Highways in Malaysia
Malaysian Federal Roads
Kuala Lumpur International Airport
Sepang District
Roads in Selangor
Transport in Negeri Sembilan